The Canaveral Barge Canal is an active canal in Brevard County, Florida, cutting east-west across northern Merritt Island just south of Cape Canaveral. It connects the Atlantic Ocean and Port Canaveral with the Indian River and wider Indian River Lagoon, part of the Intracoastal Waterway. The canal consists of two segments separated by the Banana River.

The canal was constructed by the U.S. Army Corps of Engineers in 1965 to allow the transport of crude oil by barge to two power plants south of Titusville, Florida. The design was expanded during the planning stage to enable the transport of Saturn rocket components to NASA's Kennedy Space Center for the Apollo program.

Canaveral Lock, the canal's only lock and the largest navigation lock in Florida, is located on the eastern segment. The lock is free of charge and takes 20 to 30 minutes for watercraft to traverse.

Vessels with drafts up to  may use the canal, which was intended for barges but not ships (the adjacent Port Canaveral allows drafts up to ). The canal is popular with recreational boaters, providing access to Sykes Creek and various marinas. The next-closest passages between the Intracoastal Waterway and the ocean are Ponce de Leon Inlet,  to the north, and Fort Pierce Inlet,  to the south.

List of crossings

References

External links
 Map: 

Canals in Florida
Merritt Island, Florida
Transportation buildings and structures in Brevard County, Florida
Indian River Lagoon
Canals opened in 1965